James Kenneth Gordon (born March 10, 1949) is a Canadian former politician. He served in the Legislative Assembly of New Brunswick from 1982 to 1987 as member of the Progressive Conservative Party from the constituency of Miramichi Bay.

References

1949 births
Living people
Progressive Conservative Party of New Brunswick MLAs
People from Miramichi, New Brunswick